American singer Jessica Simpson has released three video albums and been featured in 18 music videos, 6 films, and 11 television programs.

Music videos

Video albums

Filmography

Films

Television

References

Videographies of American artists
Videography